"Western Wind" is a song by Canadian singer-songwriter Carly Rae Jepsen, released as the lead single from her sixth studio album The Loneliest Time on May 6, 2022, by 604, Schoolboy, and Interscope Records. The song, co-written with and produced by Rostam Batmanglij, was released alongside a music video directed by Taylor Fauntleroy which features Jepsen "in a lush landscape wearing pretty, flowing pastel outfits, aptly capturing the season and embracing spring fever."

Background 
During the COVID-19 pandemic, Jepsen's maternal grandmother passed away, and due to Jepsen being in California, her grandmother being back in Jepsen's native Canada, and them being separated by international travel restrictions, Jepsen was alone while grieving. Per an interview with Cracks Ilana Kaplan, the grief and separation from her family fueled her creativity, leading to "Western Wind", which Kaplan describes as a "bewitching, lightly percussive lead single that evokes Stevie Nicks and recalls [Jepsen's] love of James Taylor." Jepsen said "Western Wind" was chosen as the lead single because "it was so opposite to what I normally do, which is start with the jingle-esque type song, and leave the rest for later."

Promotion 
Jepsen first teased the single release via messages posted to her Twitter account, including lyrics excerpts and a hand-drawn map of California with the caption "x marks the spot" posted on April 4. This was followed on April 6 by billboards which had the words "Western Wind" and a phone number. Calling the phone number returned a prerecorded message from Jepsen where she said "Hello. You've reached the Carly Rae Jepsen hotline. Text me here to stay in the loop on all the kinds of things: new music, tour, secrets that I haven't even come up with yet. News... no, wait, there will be no news. Sorry. But there will be music for sure." On April 16, Jepsen debuted the new song live at her Coachella set.

Music video 
The single was released alongside a music video directed by Taylor Fauntleroy. The video depicts Jepsen riding an electric scooter across green fields, twirling through yellow flowers, and frolicking in an assortment of diaphanous gowns. Per The A.V. Clubs Gabrielle Sanchez, the video "feels like something plucked from a Wes Anderson film." In an interview with Consequence of Sounds Kyle Meredith, Jepsen says the video was inspired by Kate Bush's "Wuthering Heights" video, specifically regarding how "even though she was alone, you could tell she was really singing to someone ... that wasn't there" and that Jepsen wanted to capture that same feeling. She also mentions that the climbing she does in the video was less difficult after a childhood of climbing trees and running around barefoot in "gravel races", leaving her feeling "right at home".

Style and reception 
Stereogums Rachel Brodsky calls the song a "breezy", "earth goddess-y love letter to California" with "piano, synths, and an easy mid-tempo beat" over which Jepsen sings "a well-timed springtime jaunt" including the lyrics "Coming in like a western wind / Do you feel home from all directions / First bloom, you know it's Spring / Reminding me love that it's all connected." Pitchforks Quinn Moreland calls the song "just the right amount of easy-going", with producer Rostam Batmanglij "once again assert[ing] himself as a skillful conjurer of chill vibes", creating a track that "coasts on a sumptuous blend of mellow keys, feathery drums, and an unassuming guitar solo."

NPR Musics Hazel Cills notes that on "Western Wind", Jepsen "shakes the glitter of her last few albums out of her hair, ditching her studied electro-pop for "Thank You"-biting bongos on this relaxed song about finding love in the wilds of California" which "builds on a slightly hippie-dippie, granola trend of pop girl restraint working its way through music over the last few years — think Folklores acoustic cottagecore, Solar Powers off-the-grid optimism, the mid-'00s, Starbucks check-out CD minimalism of Haim's jazzy 2019 single "Summer Girl".

Rankings

Personnel 
 Carly Rae Jepsen – vocals, songwriting
 Rostam Batmanglij – songwriting, producer, acoustic guitar, bass, conga, drum, electric guitar, clapping, organ, piano, shaker, synthesizer, tambourine, background vocals, programming, recording engineer
 Andrew Tachine – conga, drums, tambourine
 Joey Messina-Doerning – conga, recording engineer
 Julia Ross and Angel Deradoorian – background vocals
 Shawn Everett – mixing engineer
 Emily Lazar and Chris Allgood – mastering engineers
 Travis Pavur – assistant recording engineer
 Ivan Wayman – additional engineer

Charts

References 

2022 singles
2022 songs
Carly Rae Jepsen songs
Songs written by Carly Rae Jepsen
Songs written by Rostam Batmanglij
Song recordings produced by Rostam Batmanglij
604 Records singles
Schoolboy Records singles
Interscope Records singles